The Men's Giant Slalom World Cup 1967 involved 5 events.

Calendar

Standings
In Men's Giant Slalom World Cup 1966/67 the best 3 results count.

Team Results
All points were shown including individual deduction. bold indicate highest score - italics indicate race wins

References

External links
 

Men's giant slalom
FIS Alpine Ski World Cup men's giant slalom discipline titles